is a Japanese professional shogi player ranked 8-dan.

Early life
Arimori was born in Okayama, Okayama Prefecture on February 13, 1963. As a junior high school student he won the 2nd  in 1977, and that same year was accepted into the Japan Shogi Association's apprentice school at the rank of apprentice professional 5-kyū under the tutelage of shogi professional Michio Ariyoshi. Arimori obtained the rank of apprentice professional 1-dan in 1979 and was awarded full professional status and the rank of 4-dan in March 1983.

Shogi professional
In March 2007, Arimori declared his intention to the Japan Shogi Association to become a Free Class player as of April 2007.

Promotion history
The promotion history for Arimori is as follows:
 5-kyū: 1977
 1-dan: 1979
 4-dan: March 9, 1983
 5-dan: August 26, 1986
 6-dan: July 13, 1991
 7-dan: September 7, 2000
 8-dan: April 1, 2022

Awards and honors
Arimori received the JSA's "25 Years Service Award" in 2011 in recognition of being an active professional for twenty-five years.

References

External links
 ShogiHub: Professional Player Info · Arimori, Kouzou

1963 births
Japanese shogi players
Living people
Professional shogi players
People from Okayama
Professional shogi players from Okayama Prefecture
Free class shogi players